The 141st Air Refueling Wing (141 ARW) is a unit of the Washington Air National Guard, stationed at Fairchild Air Force Base, Spokane, Washington. If activated to federal service, the 141 ARW is gained by the United States Air Force and assigned to the Air Mobility Command (AMC).  As a result of BRAC action, the 141 ARW no longer has any unit-assigned aircraft and shares KC-135R aircraft with AMC's 92d Air Refueling Wing at Fairchild AFB.

The 116th Air Refueling Squadron assigned to the Wings 141st Operations Group, is a descendant organization of the World War I 116th Aero Squadron, established on 28 August 1917. It was reformed on 6 August 1924, as the 116th Observation Squadron, and is one of the 29 original National Guard Observation Squadrons of the United States Army National Guard formed before World War II.

Overview
The 141st Air Refueling Wing's mission is to provide the core aerial refueling capability for the United States Air Force and the Air Guard. This unique aircraft enhances the Air Force's capability to accomplish its primary missions. It also provides aerial refueling support to Air Force, Navy and Marine Corps and allied nation aircraft. Equipped with the KC-135 Stratotanker, the Wing is capable of transporting litter and ambulatory patients using patient support pallets during aeromedical evacuations. The KC-135 has often served as transport for its own units such as the 141 Security Police Squadron, now 141 Security Forces Squadron.

Units
The 141st Air Refueling Wing is composed of the following units:
 141st Operations Group
 116th Air Refueling Squadron
 141st Maintenance Group
 141st Mission Support Group
 141st Medical Group

The 141 ARW provides support to two squadrons that are assigned to the 194th Regional Support Wing but are geographically separated units stationed at Fairchild AFB:
 242d Combat Communications Squadron
 256th Intelligence Squadron

History
On 1 May 1956 the Washington Air National Guard 116th Fighter-Interceptor Squadron was authorized to expand to a group level, and the 141st Fighter Group (Air Defense) was allotted by the National Guard Bureau, extended federal recognition and activated.  The 116th FIS becoming the group's flying squadron. Other squadrons assigned into the group were the 141st Headquarters, 141st Material Squadron (Maintenance), 141st Combat Support Squadron, and the 141st USAF Dispensary.

Air Defense
The 141st Fighter Group (AD) was assigned to the Oregon ANG 142d Air Defense Wing.  In 1957, the interceptor aircraft were upgraded from the Korean War era F-94A Starfes to the more capable F-89J Scorpion.
In 1960, the 141st Fighter Group (AD) was reassigned to the Washington Air National Guard headquarters and was re-designated as the 141st Fighter Group on 1 July.

Two 141st fighters crashed during the winter of 1961/62.  On 28 December 1962, a Northrop F-89 Scorpion jet interceptor flown by Captain Donald Repp and 1st Lieutenant William Auvill lost power and crashed while on approach to Geiger Field. Both pilots were killed. A second crash occurred a week later when, on 6 January 1962, an F-89 flown by Captain Donald Adcock and Lt Larry Grosse crashed northeast of Penticton, British Columbia. Grosse died in the crash, but Adcock survived after ejecting and was rescued by a Royal Canadian Air Force helicopter crew. Another crash occurred on 17 November 1963, when mechanical failure caused an F-89 to crash during a night training mission near Windy Peak in Okanogan County, Washington.  The observer, Major Rolin Deschane, was rescued near the crash site, but the body of the pilot, Captain Robert Boucher, wasn't recovered until 1974.

In 1965, the Washington Air National Guard announced that the 116 FIS would convert from the F-89 to the nuclear-capable Convair F-102 Delta Dagger. 1967 was a "trophy" year for the 141st Fighter Group and the 116th. Trophies and awards received included the Spaatz Trophy for the most Outstanding Air National Guard Flying Unit, the Air National Guard Outstanding Unit Plaque, the Air Force Outstanding Unit Trophy and the Winston P. Wilson Award. In 1969, the unit accumulated an outstanding record, 37,900 accident-free flying hours, receiving the 25th Air Division Flying Safety Award five years in a row.

Air Refueling mission
In July 1976, the 141st Fighter Group was transferred to Strategic Air Command (SAC) and the 116th Fighter Squadron converted to the KC-135 Stratotanker, becoming the fifth Air National Guard unit to join SAC. With the transfer, the 141st was changed in status from a Group to a Wing.  The 141st Air Refueling Wing also moved from Geiger Field to nearby Fairchild Air Force Base to accommodate the larger KC-135A aircraft. An Air National Guard spokesman at the time characterized the conversion from the McDonnell F-101 Voodoo to the Boeing KC-135 Stratotanker as "like giving up an MG for a semi-truck".

During the 1990 Gulf Crisis, aircrew, maintenance and support personnel responded to the Iraq invasion of Kuwait on 2 August 1990, and deployed to Jeddah, Saudi Arabia.  Upon federal activation in December 1990, all eight of the unit’s KC-135's deployed to the Middle East.   The 116th refueled coalition attack aircraft during Operation Desert Storm.

In December 1991, the unit responded with aircrew and support personnel for Operation Restore Hope, a United Nations relief mission to aid hunger victims in Somalia. In 1992, the Air Force considered, but ultimately rejected, converting the 141st from an air refueling wing to a bomb wing equipped with the Boeing B-52 Stratofortress, possibly transferred from the 92d Bomb Wing. June 1995, several rotations deployed to Pisa, Italy, for Operation Deny Flight, NATO mission enforcing the no-fly zone over Bosnia-Herzegovina.  In May 1999, six KC-135E's deployed to Budapest, Hungary in support of Operation Allied Force to deter ethnic aggressions in Yugoslavia.

On 13 January 1999, one of the unit's KC-135Es crashed at NATO Air Base Geilenkirchen Air Base, Germany, killing all four crew members. This was the first time the unit lost an aircraft or lives since beginning the aerial refueling mission in 1976.  A monument was erected at the site the following year.

Global War on Terrorism
After the 11 September 2001 attacks, the 141st ARW began refueling flights supporting Operation Noble Eagle almost immediately. In 2002 a new digital navigation system, called Pacer CRAG, was added to the aircraft and crews trained to function without a navigator.  Members of the 116th also joined the thousands of Guard and Reserve forces called up to deploy all over the world in support of America's "War on Terror."

When the first Guard KC-135 R-model landed on Fairchild AFB in January 2003, with its new engines, it became the 40th different airplane the 116th pilots had flown since it was created back in 1924. Each one of the four engines of the KC-135R produces over 21,000 pounds of thrust.  The unit's first plane, the JN-6-A2 "Jenny," had a wooden body covered in fabric and only weighed 1,430 pounds.

At the time President George W. Bush ordered coalition military units into Iraq during Operation Iraqi Freedom in March 2003, the 116th was in a training status to transition into the R model KC-135. Since then the 116th has supported continuous deployments including antiterrorism efforts abroad under Operation Enduring Freedom and air refueling missions over the US for homeland defense flights under Operation Noble Eagle.

During a banquet ceremony in July 2003, the 141st Air Refueling Wing accepted the coveted Solano Trophy marking the wing as the best Air National Guard unit in the 15th Air Force.

Overseas deployments and homeland security refueling missions have dominated the tasking landscape for the squadron since 2004.  In response to the Congress-mandated 2005 Base Realignment and Closure process, the last of the KC-135 Stratotankers belonging to the 141st Air Refueling Wing were redirected to Iowa, and as of 1 October 2007 116th crew members now share aircraft with the active duty 92d Air Refueling Wing.

Today, 116th crews still deploy around the world to fulfill Air Expeditionary Force commitments much the same as during the First World War.

Lineage
 Designated 141st Fighter Group (Air Defense), and allotted to Washington ANG, 1956
 Extended federal recognition and activated, 16 April 1956
 Re-designated: 141st Fighter Group, 1 July 1960
 Status changed from Group to Wing, 1 July 1976
 Re-designated: 141st Air Refueling Wing, 1 July 1976

Assignments
 142d Air Defense Wing, 16 April 1956
 Washington Air National Guard, 1 July 1960
 Gained by: Spokane Air Defense Sector, Air Defense Command
 Gained by: 25th Air Division, Air Defense Command, 1 September 1963
 Gained by: 25th Air Division, Aerospace Defense Command, 15 January 1968
 Gained by: Strategic Air Command, 1 July 1976
 Gained by: Air Combat Command, 1 June 1992
 Gained by: Air Mobility Command, 1 June 1993–Present

Components
 141st Operations Group, 1 June 1992 – Present
 116th Fighter (later Fighter-Interceptor, Air Refueling) Squadron, 116 April 1956 – Present

Stations
 Geiger Field, Washington, 16 April 1956
 Fairchild AFB, Washington, 1 July 1976–Present

Aircraft

 F-94A Starfire, 1956–1957
 F-89J Scorpion, 1957–1965
 F-102A Delta Dagger, 1966–1969
 F-101B Voodoo, 1969–1976

 KC-135A Stratotanker, 1976–1982
 KC-135E Stratotanker, 1982–2006
 RC-26B Metroliner, 2004–Present
 KC-135R Stratotanker, 2006–Present

References

Further reading

 The official History of the Washington National Guard, Volume 7, Washington National Guard in post World War II
 Rogers, B. (2006). United States Air Force Unit Designations Since 1978. 
  Cornett, Lloyd H. and Johnson, Mildred W., A Handbook of Aerospace Defense Organization  1946–1980, Office of History, Aerospace Defense Center, Peterson AFB, CO (1980).
 Maurer, Maurer, Air Force Combat Units of World War II, Office of Air Force history (1961). 
 141st Air Refueling Wing@globalsecurity.org
 141st Air Refueling Wing website history page

External links

 141st Aerial Refueling Wing
 Video of a 141 ARW KC-135R performing an in-flight refueling

Wings of the United States Air National Guard
Military units and formations in Washington (state)
0141